Kalok Chow (born 7 October 1995) is a Hong Kong actor currently contracted to TVB.

He is best known for his work in the ongoing TVB sitcom franchise, Come Home Love. In particular, he won the TVB Anniversary Award for Best Supporting Actor in 2019 for his comedic performance as Kam Shing-On in Come Home Love: Lo and Behold. He won the TVB Anniversary Award for Most Popular Male Character with his role in the 2022 drama Your Highness.

Early life 
Kalok Chow was born on 7 October 1995 in Hong Kong and grew up as the middle child in a family of three children. He attended Ho Yu College and Primary School, where he discovered his passion for acting and performing after a drama teacher noticed his expressive personality and encouraged him to join the school's drama club. After completing Form 3 in Hong Kong, he pursued his senior high school studies abroad at Henley High School in Adelaide, Australia. Chow returned to Hong Kong shortly upon completing Year 12.

Career 
Chow successfully auditioned for TVB's 28th Artiste Training Class in 2015, after being prompted by his older sister who saw a television advertisement for the opportunity. He appeared in many background roles as part of this training, including in Come Home Love, which was his television debut. A few months later, Chow was cast in a regular role in 2016 sitcom Come Home Love: Dinner at 8, playing a variety show production assistant named 'Yu Yat-Tong'. 

In 2017, Chow landed a major supporting role in the ongoing sitcom Come Home Love: Lo and Behold as the lazy millennial 'Kam Shing-On (On Jai)'. He gained significant popularity and received critical acclaim for his comedic performance in the role. The role also earned him several nominations and awards - most notably Best Supporting Actor at the  2019 TVB Anniversary Awards. He currently holds the record for being the youngest actor to win this award, at age 24. In March 2021, it was announced that he would be taking a break from the role after 1255 episodes to film other projects. He continued to make guest appearances on the show during this hiatus, and briefly returned to the role in February 2022. 

In 2021, it was announced that Chow would be replacing Wong Cho Lam in wuxia comedy Your Highness. This drama marks Chow's debut in a first male lead role, and it began airing August 2022. In the same year, Chow also starred in mini-series Communion.

He has also been announced as part of the main line-up in upcoming dramas Treasure of Destiny, My Pet My Angel and Romeo and His Butterfly Lover.

Filmography

Television dramas

Awards and nominations

Hong Kong Television Awards

People's Choice Television Awards

TVB Anniversary Awards

AEG Entertainment Awards

References

External links
 
 

1995 births
Living people
21st-century Hong Kong male actors
Hong Kong male television actors